Monopolowa, originally a Polish brand, is a vodka  made in Austria by Gessler. It is distilled from potatoes and is marketed under the brand name of J. A. Baczewski.

History 
"Monopolowa" means "monopoly", in this case referring to a privilege given to the Polish nobility class of the szlachta, giving them exclusive rights to produce and sell vodka in their territories. 

Monopolowa was produced by J. A. Baczewski until World War II. After the war, Gessler, an Austrian company, bought the licence and the rights to production. In 1990, the Starogard Gdański based branch of Polmos, a privatized offshoot of the former state-owned monopoly, started to produce several of J.A. Baczewski's products under license from Altvater Gessler - J.A. Baczewski International (USA) Inc. However, in the late 1990s, the license was terminated and production in Poland was halted.

Monopolowa has consistently scored top marks in awards and is marketed to consumers looking for a high quality product with a low price. It scored a 94 at the 2003 International Review of Spirits, the highest score, tying with Stolichnaya. In 2008, the independent Beverage Testing Institute gave Monopolowa a rating of 93/100, calling the vodka "exceptional".

Tasting Notes
Taste tests from the Beverage Testing Institute describe the vodka as follows: "clear, [with] mild aromas of buttercream, candied citrus peel and anise follow through on a round, silky entry to a dryish medium body with notes of banana taffy and minerals. Finishes with long, very smooth fade. A pristine, poised vodka for sipping neat or in martinis." Vodka Monopolowa is suited for usage in mixed drinks of all kinds, and is sometimes served with a squeeze of lemon juice to "further enhance the flavour and texture."

Awards
 Top 10th Percentile Vodka: Proof66.com 
 2010 The Beverage Testing Institute International Review of Spirits Award: Gold Medal. Rated: 93 points (Exceptional) & Best Buy
 2009 The International Wine and Spirit Competition: Silver Medal
 2009 San Francisco World Spirits Competition: Silver Medal
 2008 The Beverage Testing Institute International Review of Spirits Award: Gold Medal. Rated: 92 points (Exceptional)

References

External links 

 Official website of Monopolowa
 Tastings.com: Monopolowa Potato Vodka

Polish vodkas